Queen of the Tabarin Club ( / ) is a 1960 French-Spanish comedy film directed by Jesús Franco and starring Mikaela, Yves Massard and Dora Doll. It follows the adventures of a troupe of travelling musicians in the 1910s. It was released in France as Mariquita, La Belle de Tabarin.

Soledad Miranda had a very small uncredited role in this film, the first time she appeared in a Franco film. She would later go on to star in 6 of Franco's thrillers in 1970, before her death in a tragic automobile accident. This was the first time Franco worked for producer Marius Lesouer as well, who would go on to produce many of Franco's later films, including his 1961 opus The Awful Dr. Orloff.

Partial cast

References

Bibliography

External links 
 

1960 films
1960s historical comedy films
French historical comedy films
Spanish historical comedy films
1960s Spanish-language films
Films directed by Jesús Franco
Films set in Spain
Films set in the 1910s
1960s Spanish films
1960s French films